Ubee may refer to:

Ubee Interactive, a Taiwanese telecommunications company
Sydney Richard Ubee (1903–1998), Royal Air Force officer

See also
UBEE